Mission 90 Days is a 2007 Indian Malayalam-language film directed by retired Army officer and former commando Major AK Raveendran SM starring Mammooty. It is Major Ravi's second directorial venture and is based on the assassination of former Indian Prime Minister Rajiv Gandhi and the following investigation.

Plot 
Rajiv Gandhi was assassinated on 21 May 1991 in Sriperumbudur, in Tamil Nadu. The government of India constituted SIT a day later, and Major Sivaram a top investigation officer and a NSG commando with a proven track record is put in charge to hunt down the killers. His bosses Partipan, the SIT chief and DIG Raju give him all the necessary logical support with only one request- "Catch Sivarasan alive, before he consumes the deadly cyanide."

Sivaram due to his meticulous and systematic search is able to piece together the case, after the arrest of Murugan, Nalini, and their interrogation leads the team to the conspirator Sivarasan hiding in a house in Bangalore. The crux of the story is the last 15 minutes climax of the film. Sivaram and his team have silently and stealthily moved and covered the house where the killers are staying. They are moving in for the final kill under the cover of darkness; waiting for orders from higher-ups sitting in Delhi, to start the operations.

But bosses in Delhi want it to be delayed, so that they can be on the spot to corner the glory of capturing Sivarasan alive in front of the media! Major Sivaram, waits the entire night for the order to start the operation, which is given only next day after the bosses arrive, at 10am in broad daylight in front of thousands of onlookers and bungling Karnataka police. The surprise element in the operation is lost as Sivaram finds to his horror the entire LTTE team had bitten the cyanide and Sivarasan the kingpin had shot himself, a few seconds before they broke in.

Cast

Mammootty as Major Sivaram, An army officer and commando in NSG, A member of the Special Investigation Team. This character is based on the professional life of Major AK Raveendran SM (also known as Major Ravi), who wrote the story of this film and directed this film.
Lalu Alex as Deputy Inspector General Radhavinod Raju IPS, CBI officer & Chief of the Special Investigation Team.
Vijayaraghavan as Colonel Vijay, NSG officer, Sivaram's superior
Kiran Raj as Salim Ali IPS,  CBI officer & member of the Special Investigation Team
Baburaj as Major Deepak, NSG officer & SIT member
Abu Salim as DSP Shivaji, SIT member
Sindhu Shyam as Journalist
Cochin Haneefa as Doctor Rajendran, SIT member
Pradeep Chandran as NSG commando Prathapan, SIT member
Kollam Ajith as Raghoothaman Inspector, SIT member
Tulip Joshi as Anitha Sivaram, wife of Major Sivaram.
Radhika as Nalini, wife of LTTE member Murugan
Sreejith Ravi as Sivarasan, LTTE member
Bineesh Kodiyeri as Murugan
Kannan Pattambi as Dixon
Ravi Mariya as ACP Chempayya, Bangalore police
Kalasala Babu as Ramalingam IPS, Commissioner of Police, Bangalore City
Salim Kumar as Aravindan
Innocent as Sivaram's father, retired army officer
Siddharth Vipin as Rajiv Gandhi
Devi (DeVriksha School of Acting - Chennai as Dhanu, the suicide bomber who assassinated Rajiv Gandhi.
Denny Philip
Manikandan Pattambi
Geetha Vijayan
Major Ravi as NSG officer (Cameo appearance)

Songs

References

External links
 

2007 films
2000s Malayalam-language films
Films about terrorism in India
Indian films based on actual events
Works about the assassination of Rajiv Gandhi
Indian Army in films
Films scored by Gopi Sundar
Films directed by Major Ravi
Indian Peace Keeping Force